Ahmad al-Mansur (Ahmad Abu al-Abbas al-Mansur, also al-Mansur al-Dahabbi (the Golden), ; and Ahmed al-Mansour; 1549 in Fes – 25 August 1603, Fes) was the King and Sultan of Morocco of Saadi from 1578 to his death in 1603, the sixth and most famous of all rulers of the Moroccans Kings Saadis dynasty. He was known to the West as the Great Golden because of his control over the supplies and mines of gold, silver, copper and salt in Morocco and over Africa. and is credited with the resurgence and rise of Morocco as a great power in Africa and Europe through his support of the Morocco. During his reign, Morocco became the most powerful military base in Africa and Europe by waging a war and revolution against the Ottoman Empire led by Sultan Murad III in 1582 and defeating them in the war and restoring independence and sovereignty to Morocco. His reign also saw the empire's expanding influence on the eastern coast of Africa and waging a war against the Songhai Empire and Mali Empire defeating it in the war and controlling Mali and the capital Gao and Timbuktu and founded Pashalik of Timbuktu and supporting Morocco the militarily and politically, which He helped determine the political and religious balance of power in Africa and Europe. It was formally and posthumously given the name Al-Mansur Golden the Great, Ahmad al-Mansur was an important figure in both Europe and Africa in the sixteenth century. He was famous for his political, military and commercial alliance with the English, and the British by Anglo-Moroccan alliance led by Elizabeth I Relations with Elizabethan England were cemented during his reign as both had a common enemy in the Spanish. and the Dutch republic, led by William the Silent, against the Spanish Habsburgs. He was known for his control of world trade and maritime piracy across the Atlantic Ocean, the Mediterranean Sea and the Strait of Gibraltar. His powerful army and strategic location made him an important power player in the late Renaissance period. He has been described as "a man of profound Islamic learning, a lover of books, calligraphy and mathematics, as well as a connoisseur of mystical texts and a lover of scholarly discussions."

Early life
Ahmad was the fifth son of Mohammed ash-Sheikh who was the first Saadi sultan of Morocco. His mother was Lalla Masuda. After the murder of their father, Mohammed in 1557 and the following struggle for power, the two brothers Ahmad al-Mansur and Abd al-Malik had to flee their elder brother Abdallah al-Ghalib (1557–1574), leave Morocco and stay abroad until 1576. The two brothers spent 17 years among the Ottomans between the Regency of Algiers and Constantinople, and benefited from Ottoman training and contacts with Ottoman culture. More generally, he "received an extensive education in Islamic religious and secular sciences, including theology, law, poetry, grammar, lexicography, exegesis, geometry, arithmetics and algebra, and astronomy."

Battle of Ksar el Kebir 

In 1578, Ahmad's brother, Sultan Abu Marwan Abd al-Malik I, died in battle against the Portuguese army at Ksar-el-Kebir. Ahmad was named his brother's successor and began his reign amid newly won prestige and wealth from the ransom of Portuguese captives.

Rule (1578–1603)
Al-Mansur began his reign by leveraging his dominant position with the vanquished Portuguese during prisoner ransom talks, the collection of which filled the Moroccan royal coffers. Shortly after, he commissioned the great architectural symbol of this new birth of Moroccan power, the El Badi Palace in Marrakesh, a huge and lavish riad-style palace which he used to receive ambassadors and to host celebrations. Construction began in December 1578 and was only finished in 1593 or 1594.

Eventually the coffers began to run dry due to the great expense of supporting the military, extensive spy services, the palace and other urban building projects, a royal lifestyle and a propaganda campaign aimed at building support for his controversial claim to the Caliphate.

Relations with Europe
Morocco's standing with the Christian states was still in flux. The Spaniards and the Portuguese were seen as the infidel, but al-Mansur knew that the only way his sultanate would thrive was to continue to benefit from alliances with other Christian economies. To do that, Morocco had to control sizeable gold resources of its own. Accordingly, al-Mansur was drawn irresistibly to the trans-Saharan gold trade of the Songhai in hopes of solving Morocco's economic deficit with Europe.

Al-Mansur developed friendly relations with England in view of an Anglo-Moroccan alliance. In 1600 he sent his Secretary Abd el-Ouahed ben Messaoud as ambassador to the Court of Queen Elizabeth I of England to negotiate an alliance against Spain.

Al-Mansur also wrote about reconquering al-Andalus for Islam back from the Christian Spanish. In a letter of 1 May 1601 he wrote that he also had ambitions to colonize the New World and settle it with Moroccans. He envisioned that Islam would prevail in the Americas and the Mahdi would be proclaimed from the two sides of the oceans.

Al-Mansur had French physicians at his court. Arnoult de Lisle was physician to the sultan from 1588 to 1598. He was then succeeded by Étienne Hubert d'Orléans from 1598 to 1600. Both in turn returned to France to become professors of Arabic at the Collège de France, and continued with their diplomatic endeavours.

Relations with Ottoman Empire 

Al-Mansur had ambivalent relations with the Ottoman Empire. At the very start of his reign he formally recognized the suzerainty of the Ottoman sultan, as Abd al-Malik had done, while still remaining de facto independent. However he quickly alienated the Ottoman sultan when he favorably received the Spanish embassy in 1579, who brought him lavish gifts, and then reportedly trampled the symbol of Ottoman suzerainty before a Spanish embassy in 1581. He also suspected that the Ottomans were involved in the first rebellions against him in his early reign. As a result, he minted coins in his own name and had Friday prayers and the khutba delivered in his name instead of in the name of Murad III, the Ottoman sultan.

In response to the removal of his name from Friday prayers, Murad III began preparations for an attack on Morocco. After getting word of this, al-Mansur rushed to send an ambassador to Istanbul with sizeable gifts and the attack was cancelled. He paid a tribute of over 100,000 gold coins, agreed to show respect to the Ottoman sultan and in return he was left alone. The embassy nearly failed to reach Istanbul due to the opposition of Uluç (later known as Kılıç Ali Paşa), the Ottoman Grand Admiral in Algiers who hoped to have Morocco invaded and incorporated into Ottoman Algeria's sphere of influence. 

In 1582, al-Mansur was also forced to agree to a special Ottoman “protection” over Morocco and to pay a certain tribute in order to stop the attacks from Algerian corsairs on the Moroccan coast and on Moroccan ships. In 1583, the Saadian and Ottoman sultans even tentatively discussed a joint military operation against the Spanish in Oran. Al-Mansur enjoyed peaceful relations with the Ottoman Empire afterwards and respected its sovereignty, but also played the Ottomans and European powers against each other and issued propaganda that undermined the Ottoman sultan's claim as leader of all Muslims. He continued to send a payment to Istanbul every year, which the Saadians interpreted as a "gift" to the Ottomans while the Ottomans considered it a "tribute".

In 1587 Uluç died and a change in the Ottoman administration in Algiers limited the power of its governors. After this, tensions between the two states further decreased, while the Saadian government further stabilized and its independence became more entrenched. Al-Mansur even felt confident enough after 1587 to drop his regular payments to Murad III. Despite the limits of his power, he officially proclaimed himself caliph in the later part of his reign, seeing himself as rival, rather than subordinate, of the Ottomans, and even as the rightful leader of the Muslim world.

Conquests

Annexation of Saharan oases 
In 1583 after the dispatch of al-Mansur led by the commander Abu Abdullah Muhammad bin Baraka and Abu Al-Abbas Ahmed Ibn Al-Haddad Al-Omari. The march of the army began from Marrakesh, and they arrived after 70 days, where they initially called for obedience and warning, after the tribal elders refused to comply, the war began. The annexed territories contained Tuat, Jouda, Tamantit, Tabelbala, Ourgla, Tsabit, Tekorareen, and others.

Annexation of Chinguetti 
The Saadians repeatedly tried to control Chinguetti, and the most prominent attempts were made during the reign of Sultan Muhammad al-Shaykh, but control of it did not come until the reign of Ahmed al-Mansur, who stripped a campaign in 1584 led by Muhammad bin Salem in which he managed to seize control of Chinguetti, modern day Mauritania.

Songhai campaign

The Songhai Empire was a West African state centered in eastern Mali. From the early 15th to the late 16th century, it was one of the largest African empires in history. On October 16, 1590, Ahmad took advantage of the recent civil strife in the empire and dispatched an army of 4,000 men across the Sahara desert under the command of converted Spaniard Judar Pasha.  Though the Songhai met them at the Battle of Tondibi with a force of 40,000, they lacked the Moroccan's gunpowder weapons and quickly fled. Ahmad advanced, sacking the Songhai cities of Timbuktu and Djenné, as well as the capital Gao. Despite these initial successes, the logistics of controlling a territory across the Sahara soon grew too difficult, and the Saadians lost control of the cities not long after 1620.

Legacy

Ahmad al-Mansur died in 1603 and was succeeded by his son Zidan al-Nasir, who was based in Marrakech, and by Abou Fares Abdallah, who was based in Fes who had only local power. He was buried in the mausoleum of the Saadian Tombs in Marrakech. Well-known writers at his court were Ahmed Mohammed al-Maqqari, Abd al-Aziz al-Fishtali, Ahmad Ibn al-Qadi and Al-Masfiwi.

Through astute diplomacy al-Mansur resisted the demands of the Ottoman sultan, to preserve Moroccan independence. By playing the Europeans and Ottomans against one another, al-Mansur excelled in the art of the balancing of power through diplomacy. Eventually he spent far more than he collected in revenue. He attempted to expand his holdings through conquest, and although initially successful in their military campaign against the Songhai Empire, the Moroccans found it increasingly difficult to maintain control over the conquered locals as time went on. Meanwhile, as the Moroccans continued to struggle in Songhai, their power and prestige on the world stage declined significantly.

Al-Mansur was one of the first authorities to take action on smoking in 1602 towards the end of his reign. The ruler of the Saadi dynasty used the religious tool of fatwas (Islamic legal pronouncements) to discourage the use of tobacco.

Popular culture
 He is featured as the playable leader of the Moroccan civilization in the 2013 computer strategy game Civilization V: Brave New World

References

Bibliography
.
.
.

1549 births
1603 deaths
16th-century Arabs
17th-century Arabs
Sultans of Morocco
Saadi dynasty
People from Marrakesh
17th-century Moroccan people
16th-century Moroccan people
People from Fez, Morocco
16th-century monarchs in Africa
17th-century monarchs in Africa